Gradačac is a city located in the Tuzla Canton of the Federation of Bosnia and Herzegovina, an entity of Bosnia and Herzegovina. As of 2013, it has a population of 39,340 inhabitants. The city is well known for its castle.

Settlements
• Avramovina
• Biberovo Polje
• Blaževac
• Donja Međiđa
• Donja Tramošnica
• Donje Krečane
• Donje Ledenice
• Donji Lukavac
• Donji Skugrić
• Gajevi
• Gornja Međiđa
• Gornja Tramošnica
• Gornje Krečane
• Gornje Ledenice
• Gornji Lukavac
• Gradačac
• Hrgovi Donji
• Jasenica
• Jelovče Selo
• Kerep
• Krčevljani
• Mionica
• Novalići
• Porebrice
• Rajska
• Samarevac
• Sibovac
• Srnice Donje
• Srnice Gornje
• Tolisa
• Turić
• Vida
• Vučkovci
• Zelinja Donja
• Zelinja Gornja i Zelinja Srednja.

Demographics

Population

Ethnic composition

History
The župa of Gradačac was first mentioned in 1302, while the town's first written mention dates from 1465 (also as Gračac). The town became part of the Ottoman Empire in 1512, its nahija (municipality) was first recorded in the defter of 1533, while its kadiluk (county) was recorded in 1634.

In 1701, the settlement was given the status of a palanka (city), and it became the headquarters of a military captaincy in 1710. The captains of the Gradaščević family led the development of the city, and the most famous of them, Husein-kapetan Gradaščević or Zmaj od Bosne ("Dragon of Bosnia"), led an uprising that raised to arms most of the Bosnian captains in 1831.

The town has a fort with 18-meter high walls built between 1765 and 1821, and a 22-meter high watchtower built in 1824 by Husein-kapetan Gradaščević on foundations made originally by the Romans. Husejnija Mosque was built in 1826.

From 1929 to 1939, Gradačac was part of the Vrbas Banovina and from 1939 to 1941 of the Banovina of Croatia within the Kingdom of Yugoslavia.

It was severely bombed during the Bosnian war 1992–1995. It is located at the narrow northern corridor that connects two major portions of the Bosnian Serb entity Republika Srpska, near Brčko. Gradačac became part of the Tuzla Canton in the Federation of Bosnia and Herzegovina after the war.

Thermal springs
The first spa facility, Ilidža Spa Treatment Centre was built on the thermal springs in Gradačac in 1882. The water temperature is 29.30˚C found at depth of 286 meters. In the area nearby are also two lakes Hazna and Vidara. Both lakes were built as part of project for protecting city from floods who took final stroke in 1964 and 1967, when the city's industrial part was underwater due to extensive floods.

Economy
The most important industries in Gradačac are textile, chemical, mechanical and food processing. Gradačac is the place where the traditional international fair for plums "Sajam šljive" (also known as "Šljivarevo") is held. In August 2015, the traditional international plum fair "Sajam šljive" was held. It was attended by 250 presenters from Bosnia & Herzegovina, Croatia, Serbia, Slovenia, Germany, Turkey and Hungary. One of the more notable local firms is "Kula", who was founded in 1960 as a small local factory producing clothing. Today, Kula is modern and respective company in Eastern Europe with 700 employees and annual production of 300.000 pieces. Kula visits fashion fairs in country and Europe. Kula's models were seen in fashion fairs in Brussel, Leipzig, Düsseldorf and Brno.

Education
In the municipality there are two high schools, seven elementary and 14 regional schools.

Sport
NK Zvijezda Gradačac

Notable people
Ivona Brandić, computer scientist
Dario Damjanović, footballer
Husein Gradaščević, nobleman
Ahmed Muradbegović, writer
Julijana Matanović, writer
Mustafa Imamović, historian
Hasan Kikić, poet
Stjepan Šiber, general
Ana Šimić, high jumper
Meliha İsmailoğlu (a.k.a. Meliha Smajlović), volleyball player

Twin towns – sister cities

Gradačac is twinned with:
 Düren, Germany

 Sivas, Turkey
 Stryi, Ukraine

Gallery

See also
Gradačac Castle

References

External links
 Gradacac.com
 Official Site
 gradacac.net
 Gradačački Info Portal

Cities and towns in the Federation of Bosnia and Herzegovina
Populated places in Gradačac
Municipalities of the Tuzla Canton